The Way of Freedom may refer to:
Der Weg einer Freiheit, German extreme metal band
The Ways of Freedom, 1981 album by Sergey Kuryokhin

See also
The Way (disambiguation)
Freedom (disambiguation)